KZZK (105.9 FM) is a regional rock radio station in the Quincy, Illinois Region owned by STARadio Corporation. As with most STARadio stations the studio is in Quincy, but the transmitter is in Missouri; the KZZK transmitter is located in New London, Missouri.

See also
Media in Quincy, Illinois

External links
Official website

ZZK